Tom Edwards is a Canadian actor, playwright and humorist. He has performed in numerous plays and stage acts, he is also a voice actor who works for Blue Water Studios. Edwards is probably best known for providing the voice of Char Aznable and Kyral Mekirel respectively in the English dub of Mobile Suit Zeta Gundam and Mobile Fighter G Gundam.

Edwards began studying acting at Bishop Grandin High School in Calgary, Alberta, Canada, around 1976 and went on to earn an undergraduate degree in drama at the University of Calgary.

Edwards is owner of Demos 4 Dummies, a business that provides voice actors with comedy scripts to apply to their demos.

Filmography

Anime roles
Deltora Quest - Barda
Mobile Fighter G Gundam - Kyral Mekirel / The Birdman
Mobile Suit Zeta Gundam - Quattro Bajeena / Char Aznable
Pretty Cure - Dark King / Zakenna
Viper's Creed - Additional voices
Zoids: Chaotic Century - Phantom

Non-anime roles
Anash and the Legacy of the Sun-Rock - Zebe, Russian Soldiers, Daxa
Freezer Burn: The Invasion of Laxdale - Alien Captain
Jet Boy - Nathan's Last Pick-up
Terminal City Ricochet - Skivver

Video game roles
Baldur's Gate II: Throne of Bhaal - various goblins, East Asian father, Dragon
Dragon Age II - additional voices (Legacy)
Mobile Suit Gundam: Gundam vs. Zeta Gundam - Quattro Bajeena
Mass Effect 3 - additional voices

References

External links
 
Tom Edwards at Crystal Acids
Tom Edwards at the Internet Movie Database

Canadian male dramatists and playwrights
Living people
Place of birth missing (living people)
Year of birth missing (living people)
Canadian male voice actors
Canadian male stage actors
Canadian comedy writers